Washington football may refer to:
 Washington Commanders, an American football team member of the National Football League based in the Washington, D.C. metropolitan area (formerly named the Washington Redskins and Washington Football Team)
 Washington Commandos, a former indoor American football team and founding member of the Arena Football League based in Washington, D.C.
 Washington Valor, a former indoor American football team of the Arena Football League based in Washington, D.C.
 Washington F.C., an association football team based in Washington, Tyne and Wear, England
 Washington Huskies football, a college football team based in the US state of Washington
 Washington State Cougars football, a college football team based in the US state of Washington
 Washington University Bears football, a college football team based in the US state of Missouri
 Washington College football, a former college football team based in the US state of Maryland
 D.C. United, an association football team member of Major League Soccer based in Washington, D.C.

See also
Sports in Washington (state)
Sports in Washington, D.C.